In the papal conclave held from 14 to 16 June 1846, Giovanni Maria Mastai Ferretti was elected to succeed the recently deceased Gregory XVI as pope. He took the name Pius IX and had the longest pontificate since Saint Peter.

50 of the 62 members of the College of Cardinals assembled in the Quirinal Palace, one of the papal palaces in Rome and the seat of two earlier 19th century conclaves. The conclave was the last to elect a ruler of the Papal States, the extensive lands around Rome and Northern Italy which the Catholic Church governed until 1870.

Conclave divided over how to rule the Papal States

It was the issue of the government of the Papal States that was to prove central to the 1846 conclave. The College of Cardinals was split into two factions. The conservatives wished to see a continuation of papal absolutism in the governance of the Papal States, a continuation of the hardline policies of Pope Gregory XVI and his right-wing Secretary of State, Luigi Lambruschini, while the liberals wished for some measure of moderate reform and favored two candidates in Tommaso Pasquale Gizzi and Giovanni Maria Mastai Ferretti. A fourth papabile was Cardinal Ludovico Micara, the Dean of the College of Cardinals, who was favored by the residents of Rome itself but he never gained support among the cardinals. Lambruschini himself was the leader of the conservatives while Tommaso Bernetti, who had served as Pro-Secretary of State under Pope Leo XII and the early part of Pope Gregory XVI's reign, was the leader of the liberal faction.

Lambruschini received a majority of the votes in the early ballots, but failed to achieve the required two-thirds majority. Cardinal Mastai Ferretti reportedly received 15 votes with the rest going to Lambruschini and Gizzi. Cardinal Gizzi was favored by the French government but failed to get additional support from the cardinals and the conclave ended up ultimately as a contest between Cardinals Lambruschini and Mastai-Ferretti. In the meantime, Cardinal Bernetti reportedly received information that Karl Kajetan von Gaisruck, the Austrian Archbishop of Milan, was on his way to the conclave to veto the election of Mastai-Ferretti and realized that if Mastai-Ferretti was to be elected he had to convince the cardinals within a few hours or accept the election of Lambruschini. Bernetti then on his own initiative personally convinced the majority of the electors to switch their support to Mastai Ferretti. Cardinal Mastai Ferretti himself however made no effort to campaign for the papacy, made no promises and maintained aloofness throughout the process. Despite not having campaigned for the papacy, Cardinal Mastai Ferretti was perceived to be "a glamorous candidate, ardent, emotional with a gift for friendship and a track-record of generosity even towards anti-Clericals and Carbonari. He was a patriot, known to be critical of Gregory XVI " Faced with deadlock and persuaded by Bernetti to keep Lambruschini from being elected pope, liberals and moderates decided to cast their votes for Mastai Ferretti in a move that contradicted the general mood throughout Europe.

On the second day of the conclave, on 16 June 1846, during the evening ballot or the fourth ballot the liberal candidate, Mastai Ferretti, Archbishop (personal title) of Imola, achieved that requirement and was elected, receiving four more than the required two-thirds majority. It is reported by papal historian Valérie Pirie that on the same ballot where he was elected, Mastai Ferretti was one of the scrutineers formally tabulating the votes and that he became emotional as it became apparent that he would be elected. Mastai Ferretti at one point begged to be excused from his role as scrutineer but was not permitted to do so since it would have invalidated the ballot. As a result, Mastai Ferretti had the rare experience of having to formally proclaim his own election to the cardinal-electors inside the conclave. He took the name Pope Pius IX (known also as Pio Nono).

Because it was night, no formal announcement was given, just the signal of white smoke. Many Catholics had assumed that Gizzi had been elected successor of St. Peter. In fact, celebrations began to take place in his hometown, and his personal staff, following a long-standing tradition, burned his cardinalitial vestments. On the following morning, the senior Cardinal-Deacon, Tommaso Riario Sforza, announced the election of Mastai-Ferretti before a crowd of faithful Catholics. When the new pope appeared on the balcony, the mood became joyous. After his election Pius IX appointed Cardinal Gizzi as his Secretary of State. Pius IX was crowned on 21 June 1846.

Failed attempt to veto Ferretti
As with other conclaves up to and including the 1903 conclave, various Catholic monarchs claimed a right to veto a cardinal who might be elected, forcing the cardinals to pick someone else. Emperor Ferdinand of Austria had charged Cardinal Karl Kajetan Gaisruck, the Archbishop of Milan (then part of the empire's territory), with vetoing the liberal Ferretti. However Gaisruck arrived too late at the conclave. By the time he got there Ferretti had been elected, had accepted the papacy and had been proclaimed publicly.

Aftermath

Pope Pius IX was crowned with the papal tiara on 21 June 1846. He became the longest-reigning pope since Saint Peter, sitting on the papal throne for nearly 32 years. Initially a liberal, following a short-lived deposition and the proclamation of the Roman Republic, Pius was returned to power by troops from the French Second Republic and became a conservative reactionary.

In 1870 the remaining territories of the Papal States were seized by Victor Emmanuel II, King of Italy. Rome became the capital of the Kingdom of Italy, with the former papal palace, the Quirinal, becoming the king's palace. Pius IX withdrew in protest to the Vatican where he lived as a self-proclaimed "Prisoner in the Vatican". He died in 1878.

Conclave factfile
 Dates of conclave: 14–16 June 1846
 Location: Quirinal Palace, Rome
 Arrived late or Absent, included:
 Karl Kajetan Gaisruck, Archbishop of Milan, Austrian Empire
 Giacomo Monico, Patriarch of Venice, Austrian Empire
 Friedrich zu Schwarzenberg, Archbishop of Salzburg, Austrian Empire
 Francisco Javier de Cienfuegos y Jovellanos, Archbishop of Seville, Kingdom of Spain
 Guilherme Henriques de Carvalho, Patriarch of Lisbon, Kingdom of Portugal
 Engelbert Sterckx, Archbishop of Mechelen, Kingdom of Belgium
 Joseph Bernet, Archbishop of Aix, Kingdom of France
 Hugues de La Tour d'Auvergne-Lauraguais, Bishop of Arras, Kingdom of France
 Placido Maria Tadini, Archbishop of Genoa, Kingdom of Sardinia
 Francesco Villadecani, Archbishop of Messina, Kingdom of the Two Sicilies
 Present included:
 Ludovico Micara, Dean of the College of Cardinals
 Carlo Oppizzoni, Archbishop of Bologna, Papal States, cardinal protopriest
 Sisto Riario Sforza, Archbishop of Naples, Kingdom of the Two Sicilies
 Costantino Patrizi Naro, Vicar General of Rome, Papal States
 Luigi Amat di San Filippo e Sorso, Prefect of the Sacred Congregation for the Propagation of the Faith 
 Tommaso Bernetti, Vice Chancellor of the Holy Roman Church
 Tommaso Pasquale Gizzi, Papal Legate of Forlì
 Giuseppe Ugolini, Papal Legate of Ferrara
 Gabriele della Genga Sermattei, Papal Legate of Urbino e Pesaro
 Chiarissimo Falconieri Mellini, Archbishop of Ravenna, Papal States
Giovanni Maria Mastai-Ferretti, Bishop of Imola, Papal States
 Giovanni Soglia Ceroni, Bishop of Osimo, Papal States
 Cosimo Corsi, Bishop of Jesi, Papal States
 Antonio Maria Cagiano de Azevedo, Bishop of Senigallia, Papal States
 Filippo de Angelis, Archbishop of Fermo, Papal States
 Paolo Polidori, Prefect of the Sacred Congregation of the Council, Titular archbishop of Tarsus
 Luigi Ciacchi
 Historic features of 1846 Conclave:
 last of three conclaves held in the Quirinal Palace and last held outside the Vatican
 election of pope who would have the second-longest reign in papal history
 last conclave held during the existence of the Papal States
 apparent victory for liberals and apparent rejection of previous pope's policies
 failed attempt by Austrian emperor to exercise a veto
 last conclave made up exclusively of cardinals from continental Europe

Notes

References

1846 in the Papal States
1846
1846 elections in Europe
19th-century Catholicism
1846 in Christianity
June 1846 events